An avivore is a specialized predator of birds, with birds making up a large proportion of its diet. Such bird-eating animals come from a range of groups.

Birds
Birds that are specialized predators of other birds include certain accipiters and falcons. General features of avian avivores include a skull form which is well adapted for grasping and crushing with the beak, although not especially well structured for neck twisting motions. Bird-eating raptors also tend to show greater sexual dimorphism than other raptors, with the females being larger than the males.

Some avian avivores such as the shikra, besra, Eurasian sparrowhawk, and sharp-shinned hawk catch their prey by flying from cover in a tree or bush, taking their prey unawares. In contrast, the lanner falcon hunts in open country taking birds by horizontal pursuit. The aplomado falcon will use both ambush and more extended flights. The peregrine falcon dives on flying birds from a great height at speeds that can exceed 300 km/h.

The extinct Haast's eagle of New Zealand preyed on the large flightless bird species of the region such as the moa.

Mammals
In certain biotopes, birds constitute the bulk of the diet of various carnivorans, e.g., of adult leopard seals that mostly prey on penguins, the Arctic fox living in coastal areas where colonies of murres, auks, gulls and other seabirds abound and stoats in New Zealand against whom flightless birds like the takahe and kiwi are defenseless. Other avivore mammals who occasionally prey on birds include most carnivora; a number of primates ranging from lorises and night monkeys over baboons and chimpanzees to humans; orcas; opossums and other marsupials; rats and other rodents; hedgehogs and other insectivora and bats.

A number of mammal species are specialized predators of birds. The caracal and the serval, both medium-sized cats, are known for their leaping ability which they use to catch flying birds, sometimes two at a time. Domestic cats may at times become specialists as bird-killers if other prey is unavailable. Some carnivora, including the red fox and martens, are known for engaging in surplus killing of birds. Kruuk (1972) observed that four red foxes killed 230 black-headed gulls in one night in a single colony at the Cumberland coast while fewer than 3% of the gulls showed any sign of being eaten. The greater noctule bat is believed to predate small migrating birds on the wing in the skies of Southern Europe.

Many mammals, such as squirrels, monkeys, and pine martens, also feed on bird eggs and young when they get the chance.

Reptiles
The egg-eating snake specializes in eating birds eggs, swallowing them whole and then breaking them using a protrusion from its spine.

Amphibians
The fanged frog Limnonectes megastomias preys on birds and insects.

Arachnids
The Goliath birdeater (Theraphosa blondi) was named by explorers who saw it eating a hummingbird.

References

Carnivory
Bird mortality
Animals by eating behaviors